Birhor people (Birhul) are a tribal/Adivasi forest people, traditionally nomadic, living primarily in the Indian state of Jharkhand. They speak the Birhor language, which belongs to the Munda group of languages of the Austroasiatic language family.

Etymology
Birhor means 'jungle people' - bir means 'jungle', hor means 'men'.

Ethnology
The Birhors are of short stature, long head, wavy hair and broad nose. They claim they have descended from the Sun and believe that the Kharwars, who also trace their descent from the Sun, are their brothers. Ethnologically, they are akin to the Santals, Mundas, and Hos.

Location
Birhors are found mainly in the area covered by the old Hazaribagh, Ranchi and Singhbhum districts before these were broken down into numerous smaller units, in Jharkhand. Some of them are also found in Orissa, Chhattisgarh and West Bengal. They are one of the smaller of the thirty scheduled tribes inhabiting Jharkhand.

Population
Birhors number around 10,000. According to some sources, their numbers could be fewer than this.

Language
Most speak Hindi, while some speak the critically endangered Birhor language, which belongs to the Munda group of languages of the Austroasiatic language family. Their language has similarities with Santali, Mundari and Ho languages. Birhors have a positive language attitude. They freely use the languages prevalent in the areas they move around and use Sadri, Santali, Ho, Mundari. Literacy rate in the first language was as low as 0.02 percent in 1971, but around 10 per cent were literate in Hindi.

Socio-economic scenario
The “primitive subsistence economy” of the Birhors has been based on nomadic gathering and hunting, particularly for monkeys. They also trap rabbits and titirs (a small bird), and collect and sell honey. They make ropes out of the fibres of a particular species of vine, which they sell in the markets of the nearby agricultural people. Partly forced by circumstances, partly encouraged by government officials, some of them have settled into stable agriculture, but others continue their nomadic life, but even when they settle down in a village, their tendency is to lead a nomadic life. According to the socio-economic standing the Birhors are classified into two groups. While the wandering Birhors are called Uthlus, the settled Birhors are called Janghis.

Traditional religious beliefs
The traditional magico-religious beliefs of Birhors are akin to those of the Hos. Mundari deities such as Sing Bonga (Sun God) and Hapram (ancestral spirits) rank high in esteem.

Hinduism and Pentecostal Christianity are making significant inroads into their society.

Settlement
The temporary Birhor settlements are known as tandas or bands. These consist of at least half a dozen huts of conical shape, erected with leaves and branches. The household possessions traditionally consisted of earthen utensils, some digging implements, implements for hunting and trapping, rope making implements, baskets and so on. In recent times aluminium and steel have found their way into Birhor huts.

Attempted integration
After Indian independence in 1947, the government has attempted to settle the Birhors by giving them land, bullocks for cultivation, agricultural implements and seeds. Schools for children, rope making centres and honey collection training centres were started. However, these efforts have borne little fruit as most of the Birhors have reverted to nomadic life.

References

External links 
 http://projekt.ht.lu.se/rwaai RWAAI (Repository and Workspace for Austroasiatic Intangible Heritage)
 http://hdl.handle.net/10050/00-0000-0000-0003-A6AE-4@view Birhor language in RWAAI Digital Archive

 Sinlung Tribes, news Northeast India

Ethnic groups in Jharkhand
Scheduled Tribes of India
Scheduled Tribes of Odisha